Mark Robinson is an English football coach, who is head coach of the development squad for Premier League club Chelsea.

Playing career
Robinson was a very promising youth player at Fulham, before injuries stopped his playing career.

Coaching career

AFC Wimbledon
Robinson joined AFC Wimbledon in 2004, two years after the club's formation. On 30 January 2021, following the sacking of Glyn Hodges, Robinson was appointed interim manager of Wimbledon. Robinson had structured the club's hugely successful Academy, having served the club for 18 years in roles from Academy Manager, Head of Coaching to Lead professional phase coach and loans manager. Also managing the youth team for 15 years he led them to successful FA Youth Cup runs beating many Premier League Clubs along the way. On the 17 February 2021, AFC Wimbledon announced the appointment of Robinson on a permanent basis. In the last 21 games he steered the form around dramatically as well as the playing style with the team playing its way out of the relegation zone and to safety,  putting together the club's most consecutive wins as a professional football Club.

After an excellent start to the 21/22 season the youngest squad in English football were top scorers in English football after 8 games as well as a record run in the Carabao Cup for the Club which ended with a loss to Arsenal at the Emirates. A series of injuries saw a dip in the Dons results. Returning players saw their form recaptured before Christmas with 3 wins and 2 draws. January saw the Club sell top scorer Ollie Palmer and the Clubs only other forward Aaron Pressley ruled out for the season through injury. A lack of fire power saw the Dons become the draw specialist as they went 20 games without a win. On the 28th March 2022, AFC Wimbledon parted company with Mark Robinson by mutual consent. Just five days earlier he was publicly backed by the board.

Chelsea Development Squad
On 22 May 2022, Robinson was announced as the new Head Coach of the Development Squad for Premier League club Chelsea.

Managerial statistics

References

1965 births
Living people
Association football coaches
AFC Wimbledon managers
English Football League managers
AFC Wimbledon non-playing staff
English football managers
Chelsea F.C. non-playing staff